This is a list of settlements in the Kavala regional unit in Greece:

 Agiasma
 Agios Andreas
 Agios Kosmas
 Akropotamos
 Amisiana
 Amygdaleonas
 Ano Lefki
 Antifilippoi
 Avli
 Avramylia
 Chalkero
 Chrysochori
 Chrysokastro
 Chrysoupoli
 Dialekto
 Dipotamos
 Domatia
 Dysvato
 Elafochori
 Elaiochori
 Eleftheres
 Eleftheroupoli
 Erateino
 Filippoi
 Folea
 Galipsos
 Georgiani
 Gerontas
 Gravouna
 Kariani
 Kavala
 Kechrokampos
 Keramoti
 Kipia
 Kokkinochoma
 Koryfes
 Krinides
 Kryoneri
 Lefki
 Lekani
 Limnia
 Lydia
 Makrychori
 Melissokomeio
 Mesia
 Mesoropi
 Moustheni
 Myrtofyto
 Nea Iraklitsa
 Nea Karvali
 Nea Karya
 Nea Peramos
 Nikisiani
 Neos Zygos
 Orfani
 Orfynio
 Palaia Kavala
 Palaiochori
 Paradeisos
 Perni
 Petropigi
 Piges
 Platamonas
 Platanotopos
 Podochori
 Polynero
 Polystylo
 Pontolivado
 Sidirochori
 Xerias
 Zarkadia
 Zygos

By municipality

See also
Slavic toponyms of places in Kavala Prefecture
List of towns and villages in Greece

 
Kavala